The Saint Paul Catholic Church Complex is located at 157 Lake Shore Road in the Detroit suburb of Grosse Pointe Farms, Michigan.  The group includes a French Gothic-style church, a Neo-Tudor rectory, a Colonial Revival parish hall, a Neo-Tudor school building, and an Elizabethan Revival convent. The complex was designated a Michigan State Historic Site in 1992 and listed on the National Register of Historic Places in 1994.

History 
The St. Paul Roman Catholic parish was the first Catholic parish in the Grosse Pointes. The origins of the parish date to the 1790s, when French Catholic priests were ministering to settlers in what was then a primarily agricultural area along Lake St. Clair.  The first building specifically built for worship was a log church, dedicated in 1825 by Father Francis Badin, located near the lake in what is now Grosse Pointe Shores.  The parish was officially organized in 1835, and in 1848 the log church was replaced by a frame chapel located on the site of the current church.

Architecture

The present church building was designed by Harry J. Rill and was completed in 1899 at a cost of just over $23,000.  The older frame structure was used as the parish hall until it was dismantled in 1914.  The rectory was added in 1911, and the original portions of the school and convent buildings, designed by Smith, Hinchman & Grylls, were built in 1927.  Additions to the school were completed in 1951 and 1953.  The parish house, originally built around 1900 for former Detroit Mayor Alexander Lewis, was purchased by the parish in 1959.

The Saint Paul Catholic Church Complex sits on a long, narrow plot of land between Lake Shore Road and Grosse Pointe Boulevard.  The church is constructed of brick and stone, and is designed in the French Gothic Revival style.  The stained glass windows were made by Fredericks & Wolfram Art Glass Company of Detroit (installed in 1901) and Franz Mayer & Company of Munich, Germany, (installed in 1924).

School
The St. Paul Church opened the school on September 6, 1927 after deciding to open the school one year earlier. The kindergarten and preschool opened in 1975 and 1993, respectively. Saint Paul offers preschool to eighth grade. The school is in the private sector of education and requires a tuition payment in order to enroll.

See also
Roman Catholic Archdiocese of Detroit

References

External links

St. Paul's homepage
St. Paul Catholic School

Churches in Wayne County, Michigan
French-American culture in Michigan
Churches in the Roman Catholic Archdiocese of Detroit
Churches on the National Register of Historic Places in Michigan
Roman Catholic churches completed in 1895
19th-century Roman Catholic church buildings in the United States
Gothic Revival church buildings in Michigan
Michigan State Historic Sites
National Register of Historic Places in Wayne County, Michigan
1895 establishments in Michigan